Amina Dagi (born Amina Mirzakhanova; ; 12 February 1995) is an Austrian model and beauty pageant titleholder who was crowned Miss Austria 2012. She competed at the Miss World 2012 pageant and was appointed Miss Universe Austria 2015 after Annika Grill resigned from Miss Universe 2015 due to competing at Miss World 2015. Dagi then represented her country at the Miss Universe 2015 pageant.

Personal life
Dagi was born in Makhachkala, Dagestan in the North Caucasus of Russia. Following the death of her father, the family immigrated to Austria in 2003, settling in Bludenz. They later received Austrian citizenship and changed their surname to Dagi, due to the often misspellings and mispronunciations of their original surname; taking the name Dagi was meant to honor their homeland of Dagestan. Dagi worked at Zusammen:Österreich prior to becoming Miss Austria, and graduated from BG Bludenz. She became Miss Vorarlberg and won Miss Austria in 2012.

Miss Austria 2012
On March 30, 2012, Amina was crowned Miss Austria 2012 at the Casino Baden while representing Vorarlberg. She competed at the Miss World 2012 pageant in China, and did not place in the semi-finals.

Appointed as Miss Universe Austria 2015
On October 15, 2015, Miss Universe Austria 2015 Annika Grill was replaced by Dagi after Grill announced that she could not compete at the Miss Universe 2015 pageant due to being the Austrian representative for Miss World 2015. She competed at the Miss Universe 2015 pageant in Las Vegas on December 20, 2015.

References

External links 
Miss Austria Official website

1995 births
Living people
People from Makhachkala
Russian emigrants to Austria
Austrian people of Russian descent
Miss Universe 2015 contestants
Austrian beauty pageant winners
Austrian female models
Miss World 2012 delegates